Sabor a ti is a Venezuelan telenovela written by Ligia Lezama and Benilde Avila which was produced by Venevisión between 2004 and 2005. The series was distributed internationally by Venevisión International.

Ana Karina Manco and Miguel de León starred as the main protagonists while Astrid Carolina Herrera, Guillermo Pérez and Julio Alcázar starred as the antagonists.

Plot
Leonardo Lombardi (Miguel de León) is a successful engineer who returns from a business trip only to find his beloved wife Raiza (Astrid Carolina Herrera) in bed with his best friend Federico (Juan Carlos Vivas). This breaks Leonardo's heart, making him become a bitter man who is distrustful of women.

Meanwhile, Miranda (Ana Karina Manco) is a medical student who is forced to give up her medical pediatrician studies in order to help out her family which is experiencing economic problems, to the point that they are about to be evicted from the building where they live. It is through this way that she meets Leonardo, whose wealthy family owns the building where Miranda lives. Leonardo offers Miranda a job in his house as the caretaker of his two children and ailing grandfather.

Life for Miranda at the Lombardi mansion becomes difficult as she has to deal with Leonardo's bitterness, his sister-in-law's Fabiana's cruelty toward's her, and the insults of Raiza, who returns to her matrimonial home to manipulate Leonardo by using their daughter's emotional problems in order to try and win him back. The only support and care she receives while in the mansion are from Salvador, Leonardo's grandfather and his two children, Carlitos and Karina. After a while, Leonardo begins to fall in love with Miranda after seeing her sweet, caring nature. However, in order for them to be happy, they will have to face the wrath of Raiza who sees Miranda as an obstacle to regaining her previous former happiness.

Cast

Main 
Ana Karina Manco as Miranda Valladares
Miguel de León as Leonardo Lombardi
Astrid Carolina Herrera as Raiza Alarcón de Lombardi
Guillermo Pérez as Darío Antonetti
Juan Carlos Vivas as Federico Carvajal
Gigi Zanchetta as Sonia Fernández
Rafael Romero as José "Cheo" Pacheco
Adrián Delgado as Manolo Martínez
Eduardo Luna as Germán Estévez
Eva Blanco as Elva "Elvita" Montiel Vda. de Valladares
Julio Alcázar as Raimundo Lombardi

Also main 
Sonia Villamizar as Fabiana Alarcón
Veronica Ortiz as Yajaira Martínez
Kassandra Tepper as Claudia
Milena Santander as Chela
Reina Hinojosa as Eloísa Lombardi
Patricia Schwarzgruber as Victoria Valladares "Vicky"
Bebsabe Duque as Ginette Alarcón
Claudia La Gatta as Cherryl
Umberto Buonocuore as Salvador Lombardi
Gerardo Soto as Alejandro Ferrer
Amilcar Rivero as Gregory
Francisco Ferrari as Padre Agustín
Rosalinda Serfaty as Andreína
Reinaldo José Pérez as Pedro García
Erika Schwarzgruber as Rina Lombardi
Pamela Djalil as Pamela
Lance Dos Ramos as Saúl Lombardi
Milena Torres as Corina
Michelle Naseff as Karina Lombardi Alarcón
Alejandro Rodríguez as Carlos "Carlitos" Lombardi Alarcón

References

External links

Venevisión telenovelas
2004 telenovelas
2004 Venezuelan television series debuts
2005 Venezuelan television series endings
Venezuelan telenovelas
Spanish-language telenovelas
Television shows set in Caracas